The Miss Vermont competition is the pageant that selects the representative for the state of Vermont in the Miss America pageant. While Vermont is the only state to have never had a contestant advance to the semi-finals of the Miss America pageant, their representatives have won numerous non-finalist awards.

Alexina Federhen of Bennington was crowned Miss Vermont 2022 on April 24, 2022, at the Chandler Center for the Arts in Randolph, Vermont. She competed for the title of Miss America 2023 at the Mohegan Sun in Uncasville, Connecticut in December 2022 where she was a Women Who Brand Finalist.

Results summary
The following is a visual summary of the past results of Miss Vermont titleholders at the national Miss America pageants/competitions. The year in parentheses indicates the year of the national competition during which a placement and/or award was garnered, not the year attached to the contestant's state title.

Placements
 Miss Americas: N/A
 1st runners-up: N/A
 2nd runners-up: N/A
 3rd runners-up: N/A
 4th runners-up: N/A
 Semi-finalists: N/A

Awards

Preliminary awards
 Preliminary Lifestyle and Fitness: N/A
 Preliminary Talent: Ashley Wheeler (2009)

Non-finalist awards
 Non-finalist Interview: Drell Latasha Hunter (2004)
 Non-finalist Talent: Joan Hewitt (1958), Brenda Naatz (1960), Melissa Hetzel (1964), Elizabeth Sackler (1969), Sue Glover (1972), Joylynn McCraw (1974), Carole Spolar (1981), Erica Van Der Linde (1986), Michelle Dawson (1987), Jacqueline Quirk (1994), Sarah Watson (2007), Ashley Wheeler (2009), Alayna Westcom (2016)

Other awards
 Miss Congeniality: Sandra Simpson (1957), Julia Crane (2019)
 Rembrandt Award for Mentorship: Vanessa Branch (1995)
 STEM Scholarship Award Winners: Lucy Edwards (2015), Alayna Westcom (2016)
 STEM Scholarship Award Finalists: Julia Crane (2019), Danielle Morse (2022)
 Women Who Brand Finalists: Alexina Federhen (2023)

Winners

References

External links
 Official website

Vermont
Vermont culture
Vermont-related lists
Women in Vermont
Recurring events established in 1945
1945 establishments in Vermont